Mara Branković or Mara Despina Hatun (c. 1416 – 14 September 1487), also known as Sultana Marija or Amerissa, was the daughter of Serbian monarch Đurađ Branković and Eirene Kantakouzene. As the daughter of Despot
Đurađ, wife of Sultan Murad II, and stepmother of Mehmed II, she came to play a significant role in the diplomatic negotiations of the Ottoman Empire. She became a leading member of the pro-Ottoman party in the Balkans and probably one of the most powerful women of the 15th century.

Family
Mara and her relations are named in "Dell'Imperadori Constantinopolitani", a manuscript held at the Vatican Library. The document is also known as the "Massarelli manuscript" because it was found in the papers of Angelo Massarelli (1510–1566). Masarelli is better known as the general secretary of the Council of Trent, who recorded the daily occurrences of the council.

The Massarelli manuscript names her as one of two daughters of Đurađ Branković and Eirene Kantakouzene. The other sister is Catherine (Kantakuzina Katarina Branković or Katarina of Celje), who was married to Ulrich II, Count of Celje (1406–1456). "The Byzantine Lady: Ten Portraits 1250–1500" (1994) by D. M. Nicol questioned her maternity, suggesting Đurađ had a prior marriage to a daughter of Alexios IV of Trebizond, Eleni.

On 11 September 1429, Đurađ made a donation to Esphigmenou Monastery at Mount Athos. The charter for the document names his wife Irene and five children. The Masarelli manuscript also names the same five children of Đurađ and Eirene. Other genealogies mention a sixth child, Todor Branković. He could be a child who died young and is thus not listed with his siblings.

The oldest sibling listed in the Massarelli document is Grgur Branković. The 1429 document mentions him with the title of Despot. According to The Late Medieval Balkans, A Critical Survey from the Late Twelfth Century to the Ottoman Conquest (1994) by J. V. A. Fine, Grgur was appointed governor of territories of southern Serbia associated with the House of Branković. He was reportedly appointed by Murad II of the Ottoman Empire in 1439. In April 1441, Grgur was accused of plotting against Murad and his governorship terminated. He was imprisoned in Amasya and blinded on 8 May 1441. According to Monumenta Serbica Spectantia Historiam Serbiae, Bosniae, Ragusii (1858) by Franz Miklosich, Grgur and his brothers co-signed a charter by which Đurađ confirmed the privileges of the Republic of Ragusa. The charter was dated 17 September 1445. According to the "Europäische Stammtafeln: Stammtafeln zur Geschichte der Europäischen Staaten" (1978) by Detlev Schwennicke, Grgur retired to a monastery under the monastic name "German". According to Fine, Grgur resurfaced in 1458, claiming the succession of the vacant throne of Serbia for himself or his son. The Massarelli manuscript describes Grgur as unwed. Later genealogies name his wife as "Jelisaveta". Vuk Grgurević, a son of Grgur, was later a titular Serbian despot (1471–1485). He was possibly illegitimate.

Mara is mentioned as the second child in the manuscript. Next are listed Stefan Branković and "Cantacuzina", a sister with the Latinized form of their mother's last name. Later genealogies give her name as Katarina. She married Ulrich II of Celje. The last sibling mentioned is Lazar Branković, the youngest of the five.

Marriage
According to Fine, Mara was betrothed to Murad II in June 1431. The betrothal was an attempt to prevent an invasion of Serbia from the Ottoman Empire, though periodic Ottoman raids continued. On 4 September 1435, the marriage took place at Edirne. Her dowry included the districts of
Dubočica and Toplica. Mara apparently "did not sleep with" her husband.

According to the chronicle of George Sphrantzes, Mara was going back to her parents when Murad II died, dating her return to 1451. Sphrantzes records that the widow rejected a marriage proposal by Constantine XI, Byzantine Emperor. Sphrantzes records that when her parents died (in 1456–1457), Mara joined the court of her stepson Mehmed II. According to Nicol, Mara maintained a presence at court but was also offered her own estate at "Ježevo". Nicol identifies Ježevo with the modern settlement of  near Serres. When Mehmed became sultan, she often provided him with advice. Her court at Ježevo included exiled Serbian nobles.

According to Nicol, Mara was joined at "Ježevo" by her sister "Cantacuzina" in 1469. The two ladies acted as intermediaries between Mehmed and the Republic of Venice during the second Ottoman–Venetian War (1463–1479). In 1471, Branković personally accompanied a Venetian ambassador to the Porte for negotiations with the Sultan.

She retained her influence over the appointment of leaders of the Orthodox Church, and remained influential during the reign of Mehmed's successor, Bayezid II. The monks of Rila monastery begged her to have the remains of John of Rila transferred to Rila monastery from Veliko Tarnovo, and thanks to her their wish was fulfilled in 1469. Because of her influence, special privileges were offered to the Greek Orthodox Christians of Jerusalem, later extended to the community of Athos Monastery. After the unsuccessful Battle of Vaslui (Moldavia, 1475), Mara remarked that the battle was the worst defeat for the Ottoman Empire.

Ancestry

Popular culture
In 2005, Turkish artist Can Atilla realized the musical composition Mara Despina.
The character of Mara Hatun is fictionalized and portrayed by Tuba Büyüküstün in the Netflix original historical docudrama Rise of Empires: Ottoman (2020). She is shown as someone who was brought from Serbia, who married Murad II for political reasons, and who supported Mehmed the Conqueror and influenced him.
The coast between Salonica and Kassandra peninsula has been named "Kalamarija" after her – "Mary the Good".

See also
 Jefimija
 Princess Milica of Serbia
 Saint Angelina of Serbia
 Olivera Despina
 Jelena Balšić
 Helen of Anjou
 Simonida
 Maria Angelina Doukaina Palaiologina

References

Further reading

 

1416 births
1487 deaths
15th-century Serbian royalty
15th-century consorts of Ottoman sultans
Mara
Medieval Serbian princesses
Christians of the Crusade of Varna
Medieval Serbian people of Greek descent
Serbs from the Ottoman Empire